A pow wow is a gathering of Native Americans.

Pow wow may also refer to:

Events
 FSU Pow Wow, the homecoming celebration of Florida State University
 POW! WOW!, an international mural arts festival
 A particular pow wow
 Meskwaki Pow Wow, an annual powwow in Meskwaki Settlement, Iowa, USA
 Long Plain First Nation Annual Pow-wow, an annual powwow in Long Plain First Nation, Manitoba, Canada
 Gathering of Nations Pow Wow, an annual powwow in Albuquerque, New Mexico, USA

Fiction
 Adventures of Pow Wow, an animated cartoon
 Powwow the Indian Boy, a fictional character from the Adventures of Pow Wow
 Pow Wow Smith, a DC Comics fictional character

Music
 Pow woW, a French music group
 Pepper's Pow Wow (album) 1971 album by Jim Pepper
 "Pow Wow", a song by music group Psycho Realm

Places
 Powwow River, a river that runs through New Hampshire and northern Massachusetts, USA
 Powwow Pond, a pond in Rockingham County, New Hampshire, USA
 Pow-Wow Oak Tree, an oak tree in Belvidere, Lowell, Massachusetts, USA
 Powwow Grounds, Albuquerque, New Mexico, USA; used to hold the annual Gathering of Nations
 Black Hawk Powwow Grounds, Komensky, Wisconsin, USA

Other uses
 Pow-wow (folk magic), a North American vernacular healing system rooted in Pennsylvania Dutch folk culture
 PowWow, a wireless sensor network (WSN) mote
 PowWow (chat program), an early instant messaging client
 POW WOW, a prisoner-of-war underground newspaper circulated in Germany during World War II
 Powwow Water, a brand of spring water produced exclusively for water coolers

See also

 Powwow-step or electric powwow, an genre of electronica
 
 
 POW (disambiguation)
 Wow (disambiguation)